Reynolds Glacier is a glacier 5 nautical miles (9 km) long, flowing eastward from the Haines Mountains along the south side of Keyser Nunatak to enter the Hammond Glacier, in Marie Byrd Land. Mapped by United States Geological Survey (USGS) from surveys and U.S. Navy air photos, 1959–65. Named by Advisory Committee on Antarctic Names (US-ACAN) for Donald K. Reynolds, ionospheric physicist at Byrd Station, 1967–68 season.

Glaciers of Marie Byrd Land